Senator Risser may refer to:

Fred Risser (Progressive politician) (1900–1971), Wisconsin State Senate
Fred Risser (born 1927), Wisconsin State Senate